Navarretia tagetina is a species of flowering plant in the phlox family known by the common names marigold pincushionplant and marigold navarretia. It is native to the western United States from Washington to central California, where it grows in wet grassland habitat such as vernal pools. It is a somewhat hairy annual herb growing up to about 30 centimeters tall. The leaves are deeply divided into many spreading needlelike lobes. The inflorescence is a cluster of many flowers surrounded by leaflike bracts. The flowers are pale blue and about a centimeter long.

References

External links
Jepson Manual Treatment
Oregon Flora Project Photo Profile
Photo gallery

tagetina
Flora of California
Flora of Oregon
Flora of Washington (state)
Natural history of the California chaparral and woodlands
Natural history of the Central Valley (California)
Flora without expected TNC conservation status